Dorzdy may refer to:

Drozdy, Masovian Voivodeship, Poland
Drazdy, a microdistrict of Minsk, Belarus